Vaccinium parvifolium, the red huckleberry, is a species of Vaccinium native to western North America.

Description

The fruit is an edible red to orange berry  in diameter.

Distribution and habitat
It is common in forests from southeastern Alaska and British Columbia south through western Washington and Oregon to central California.

In the Oregon Coast Range, it is the most common Vaccinium. It grows in moist, shaded woodlands.

Ecology
Birds, bears, and small mammals eat the berries. Deer and some livestock forage the foliage.

Cultivation 
The species is cultivated in the specialty horticulture trade with limited availability as an ornamental plant: for natural landscaping, native plant, and habitat gardens; wildlife gardens; and restoration projects.  Another cultivated species of similar size and habitats is the evergreen Vaccinium ovatum (evergreen huckleberry).

As a crop plant (along with the other huckleberries of the genus in western North America), it is not currently grown on a large commercial agriculture scale, despite efforts to make this possible.  It requires acidic soil (pH of 4.5 to 6) and does not tolerate root disturbance.

Uses
Indigenous peoples of North America—including the Bear River Band, Karok, and Pomo tribes—found the plant and its fruit very useful. The bright red, acidic berries were used extensively for food throughout the year. Fresh berries were eaten in large quantities, or used for fish bait because of the slight resemblance to salmon eggs. Berries were also dried for later use. Dried berries were stewed and made into sauces, or mixed with salmon roe and oil to eat at winter feasts.

The bark or leaves of the plant were brewed for a bitter cold remedy, made as tea or smoked. The branches were used as brooms, and the twigs were used to fasten western skunk cabbage leaves into berry baskets.

Huckleberries can be eaten fresh or dried or prepared as a tea or jelly.

References

External links

Jepson Flora Project: Vaccinium parvifolium
Native American Ethnobotany: Vaccinium parvifolium
Plants of British Columbia: Vaccinium parvifolium
USDA: Vaccinium parvifolium

parvifolium
Berries
Flora of the West Coast of the United States
Flora of Alaska
Flora of British Columbia
Flora of Oregon
Flora of Washington (state)
Flora of California
Flora of the Cascade Range
Flora of the Klamath Mountains
Flora of the Sierra Nevada (United States)
Plants used in traditional Native American medicine
Plants used in Native American cuisine
Garden plants of North America
Bird food plants
Flora without expected TNC conservation status